The 1913 Cork Senior Hurling Championship was the 26th staging of the Cork Senior Hurling Championship since its establishment by the Cork County Board in 1887.

Blackrock were the defending champions.

On 30 November 1913, Blackrock won the championship following a 3-3 to 2-3 defeat of Midleton in the final. This was their 14th championship title overall and their fourth title in succession.

Team changes

To Championship

Promoted from the Cork Intermediate Hurling Championship
 Ballincollig

Results

First round

Second round

Semi-finals

Final

Championship statistics

Miscellaneous

 Blackrock became the first team to win four successive championship titles. It was a record which stood for 25 years until 1938 when Glen Rovers won five-in-a-row.

References

Cork Senior Hurling Championship
Cork Senior Hurling Championship